Churchill Mountain is a mountain located in the Catskill Mountains of New York east-southeast of Stamford. Utsayantha Mountain is located northeast, Cowan Mountain is located southwest, and McGregor Mountain is located east of Churchill Mountain.

References

Mountains of Delaware County, New York
Mountains of New York (state)